Who Says I Can't Ride a Rainbow! is a 1971 American family drama film directed by Edward Andrew Mann and starring Jack Klugman.  It also features Morgan Freeman in his first credited film appearance.  It is based on the true story of Barney Morowitz, who "struggled to maintain a pony stable in Greenwich Village."

Plot

Cast
Jack Klugman as Barney
Norma French as Mary Lee
Reuben Figueroa as Angel
David Mann as David
Kevin Riou as Kevin
Val Avery as The Marshal
Morgan Freeman as Afro
Skitch Henderson as himself
Heather MacRae as herself
Oatis Stephens as himself

Production
Principal photography occurred on January 1970 in New York City.

References

External links

1971 films
1970s biographical drama films
1971 independent films
American biographical drama films
American films based on actual events
American independent films
Films set in New York City
Films shot in New York City
1971 drama films
1970s English-language films
1970s American films